Dragon Hopper is an unreleased action-adventure video game that was in development by Intelligent Systems and planned to be published by Nintendo on a scheduled 1996 release date exclusively for the Virtual Boy. Along with Japan System Supply's Bound High!, it would have been one of the first second-generation titles for the system if not for the poor critical and commercial reception it garnered that led to its planned relaunch being discontinued, which also led to the game's cancellation in the process.

Players control the young dragon prince Dorin as he embarks on a journey through the land of Faeron rescuing fairies and elemental spirits from enemy captivity in order to free his jailed loved ones and defeat a corrupt prime minister. Dragon Hopper was showcased on various trade shows and previewed in video game magazines but it was ultimately shelved due to the failure of the Virtual Boy itself, despite being completed for release.

Gameplay and premise 

Dragon Hopper is a top-down action-adventure game similar to The Legend of Zelda: Link's Awakening and Virtual Boy Wario Land where players take control of young dragon prince Dorin, the protagonist, who lives in the kingdom of Celestia with his family and girlfriend until all but Dorin are captured by a corrupt prime minister. Dorin falls into a hole that leads him to the land of Faeron, where he must climb back up to stop the prime minister through multi-level maze-like stages of varying themes. 

Players have the ability to make Dorin jump onto staggered floors floating above the main playfield. Dorin does not get hurt from high falls, though there are obstacles that hurt him if he lands on them. Players explore the levels collecting scattered items, interact with non-player characters, and defeat monsters to progress. Each stage also hosts hidden warps to a magic shop, where players can spend earned Star Coins on new magic spells or enter a bonus room.

At the end of each stage, a boss must be fought in order to progress further on the adventure. After doing so, an elemental spirit grants hints and new abilities to Dorin. Through the journey, Dorin is attended by a small fairy who provides help to the player. With battery-backed memory, a special feature called "Element of Discovery" allows Dorin to wander through each level in search of a star that transports him to the next level.

History 
Dragon Hopper was first showcased alongside Bound High! to the attendees of Shoshinkai 1995 and was later showcased in video game magazines in 1996, with plans to reach store shelves during summer of the same year. It went by the name D-Hopper. The game was showcased along with Bound High! in a playable state at the show floor of E3 1996, and was slated for release on 26 August 1996 in both the United States and Japan. It received previews from publications such as Nintendo Power magazine, but was eventually cancelled due to Nintendo discontinuing the Virtual Boy for being a critical and commercial failure. The only remaining proof of its existence are various screenshots taken by several gaming magazines and gameplay footage, while no prototypes containing a ROM image of the game has been found to date despite various rumors.

Notes

References

External links 
 Dragon Hopper at Planet Virtual Boy

1996 video games
Action-adventure games
Cancelled Virtual Boy games
Video games about dragons
Fantasy video games
Intelligent Systems games
Nintendo games
Single-player video games
Video games developed in Japan